Ar Rahidah is a small village in Dimnat Khadir District, Taiz Governorate of Yemen.

References

Populated places in Taiz Governorate
Villages in Yemen